Techno Viking is an internet phenomenon or meme based on a video from the 2000 Fuckparade in Berlin, Germany.

Summary
The four-minute video shot by experimental video artist Matthias Fritsch at the Fuckparade on 8 July 2000 begins with the title "Kneecam No. 1". The camera is on a group of dancing people with a blue-haired woman in front. A man stumbles into the scene grabbing the woman. A bare-chested man (known colloquially as the Techno Viking) wearing a Mjölnir pendant enters the scene while turning to that man.  He grabs him by the arms and the camera follows, showing the confrontation. The bare-chested man pushes the guy back in the direction he came. He looks at him sternly and then points his finger at him, ensuring he behaves. Then the camera follows the bare-chested man as the techno parade continues. Another observer comes from the back of the scene offering an inverted bottle of water to him. As the situation calms down, the bare-chested man starts to dance down Rosenthaler Straße to techno music.

Reception and release

Fritsch uploaded the video to the internet in 2001. Fritsch intended to raise questions of whether the action was real or staged. In 2006 an unknown user re-published it to YouTube, and it went viral in 2007. According to Fritsch, its popularity began on a Central American pornography site. After being posted on Break.com, it peaked on 28 September at more than 1 million views per day and was watched by over 10 million people over 6 months. More than 700 responses and edited versions were posted. It was the #1 clip on Rude Tube'''s series-three episode Drink and Drugs. Mathew Cullen and Weezer wanted to include Techno Viking in their compilation of Internet memes for the "Pork and Beans" music video but were unable to. Techno Viking was also rendered in oils as part of a series on internet memes.
Fritsch mounted an installation and the online Techno Viking Archive "to research the strategies of participatory practice in digital social networks" and presented lectures on the reception of the video. His Music from the Masses project was suggested by the Techno Viking experience: it explores web collaboration by providing silent films for artists to provide soundtracks. In response to legal action by the man featured in the video, access to the Techno Viking video itself has been restricted and annotations on YouTube blocked since late 2009.

Identity and lawsuit

Fritsch did not know the man's name at the time of filming. A man who appeared in the 2009 "Bodybuilding" broadcast of the German television show segment Raab in Gefahr was taken to be Techno Viking in a YouTube upload. In 2008, fans claimed MMA fighter Keith Jardine was Techno Viking. The lawyer of the Techno Viking asserts that his client had never been a public figure and that he did not want to become one.

The unnamed man's court case against Fritsch concerning infringement of personality rights opened in Berlin on 17 January 2013."All Heil Technoviking! Der Technoviking verklagt seinen Schöpfer" , Zeitjung.de, 18 January 2013  In June, a decision was reached for the plaintiff and Fritsch was ordered to pay the man €13,000 in damages, almost all he had made from YouTube ads and sales of Techno Viking merchandise, plus €10,000 in court costs, and to cease publication of his image.Ana Samways, "Pronunciation Sought" , Sideswipe, New Zealand Herald, 1 July 2013.Kevin Morris, "Technoviking prevails in court, still can't erase Internet fame" , Daily Dot, 26 June 2013.

Documentary film
Fritsch raised money with a crowdfunding campaign to make a documentary film about the case, The Story of Technoviking'', which was released in 2015.

Notes

References

External links
 Mikkael Kinanen, Matthias Fritsch: "Kneecam No. 1 (aka Technoviking)", Inter-Cool 3.0.
 Shinya Yamaoka making a statuette of Techno Viking (YouTube slideshow)
 Technoviking.tv collection of fan responses and links
 

Internet memes introduced in 2001
Viral videos
2006 YouTube videos
Films set in Berlin
Unidentified people
German male dancers
Internet memes